Yeh Dil Aap ka Huwa is a 2002 Lollywood Urdu film starring Sana, Moammar Rana and Saleem Sheikh among others. It was directed by Jawed Sheikh and ran successfully in theaters across Pakistan. The film's soundtrack is composed by Amjad Bobby.

The film won 8 Nigar Awards in 2002.

Synopsis
The film revolves around the romance of  Moammar Rana, a young Pakistani living in Switzerland who has unidentified yearnings for eastern culture, and Sana.

Release
Internationally, the film was also released in London and the United States, making it the first Pakistani film to be released in Europe and North America.

Distribution
The distribution rights of the movie were acquired byo Sony Entertainment.

Home Media
The DVD of the movie was released by Sadaf Entertainment and Sony Home Entertainment . The international television rights of the movie were syndicated between Sony Max and Geo TV.

Cast
 Moammar Rana as Falak
 Sana as Sitara
 Saleem Sheikh as Chaand
 Javed Sheikh as Jamal
 Badar Khalil
 Veena Malik as Pinki
 Babar Ali as Zargul
 Zoha
 Ismail Tara
 Shafqat Cheema as Inspector

Soundtrack
The music is composed by Amjad Bobby who produced many hit film songs for 2002.

The music rights of the movie were syndicated between Sony Cassettes and Oriental Star Agencies Ltd.

Awards

Lux Style Awards

References

External links

 Ye Dil Aapka Hua - Nigar Awards

2000s Urdu-language films
Pakistani romance films
2002 films
Nigar Award winners
2000s romance films
Films shot in Switzerland
Films scored by Amjad Bobby